Kemal Arda Gürdal (born 2 July 1990) is a Turkish freestyle swimmer. At the 2012 European Aquatics Championships held in Debrecen, Hungary, he set a new national record in 100 m freestyle with 49.64, and equaled the national record in 200 m freestyle of Aytekin Mindan from 2002.

Gürdal was invited for participation in the 100 m freestyle event at the 2012 Summer Olympics. At the 2013 Mediterranean Games held in Mersin, Turkey, he won two silver and two bronze medals.

Achievements

References

1990 births
Living people
Turkish male freestyle swimmers
Galatasaray Swimming swimmers
Olympic swimmers of Turkey
Swimmers at the 2012 Summer Olympics
Place of birth missing (living people)
Mediterranean Games silver medalists for Turkey
Mediterranean Games bronze medalists for Turkey
Swimmers at the 2013 Mediterranean Games
Swimmers at the 2018 Mediterranean Games
Mediterranean Games medalists in swimming
20th-century Turkish people
21st-century Turkish people